Kilkerrin-Clonberne is a Gaelic Athletic Association club based in Clonberne, County Galway, Ireland.

History
In his 'Annals of the GAA in Galway 1884-1901', Padraic O'Laoi notes that Clonberne - like Menlough - was initially a hurling club and was one of only 26 clubs in the county to play matches under GAA rules in 1885.

They achieved Senior status in 1996 and have competed in the Galway Senior Club Football Championship up until 2015.  They were relegated to the Intermediate ranks by a strong Kilconly side.

Notable former players include Johnny Geraghty & Christy Tyrell, members of Galway's famous 3 in a row team and John Divilly, a member of Galway's All-Ireland triumph in 1998.

In 1999, the Ladies football club in Clonberne won an intermediate club All-Ireland. They were runners up in 2019 Senior All-Ireland Ladies' Club Football Championship and won the 2021 final.

Notable players

Men's football
 Martin Breheny — played for, and later served as secretary of, the club before he moved to Dublin in 1979
 John Divilly
 Shane Walsh

Ladies' football
 Annette Clarke
 Olivia Divilly

Notable teams
2021 All-Ireland Senior Ladies' Club Football Championship Winners:

KILKERRIN-CLONBERNE: L Murphy; A Costello, S Gormally, C Costello; S Fahy, N Ward, C Dunleavy; S Divilly, H Noone; O Divilly, L Ward, L Noone; E Noone, C Miskell, A Morrissey.

Subs: N Divilly for Miskell (42), K Mee for Fahy (47), A Clarke for Morrissey (52), M Flanagan for L Noone (60).

Scorers: O Divilly 0-5 (3f), C Miskell 1-0, E Noone 0-2 (1f), A Morrissey 0-2, L Ward 0-1, N Ward 0-1.

Honours
All-Ireland Senior Ladies' Club Football Championship:
 Winners (1): 2021
 Runners-up (1): 2019
Connacht Ladies' Senior Club Football Championship:
 Winners (6): 2014, 2015, 2018, 2019, 2020, 2021
 Runners-up (3): 2000, 2013, 2017
Galway Ladies’ Senior Club Football Championship:
 Winners (9): 2000, 2013, 2014, 2015, 2017, 2018, 2019, 2020, 2021
All-Ireland Intermediate Ladies' Club Football Championship:
 Winners (1): 1999
Connacht Ladies' Intermediate Club Football Championship:
 Winners (1): 1999
Galway Intermediate Senior Club Football Championship:
 Winners (1): 1999
All-Ireland Senior Ladies Club 7’s:
 Winners (1):  2022

References

Gaelic football clubs in County Galway
Gaelic games clubs in County Galway